Sage Intacct, Inc is an American provider of cloud-based Financial management and services available in five regions around the globe -- including the United States, Canada, the UK, Australia, and South Africa. Its products offer cloud-based accounting applications that enable business payments, manage and pay bills, and facilitate payroll functions.

The company was founded in 1999 and it was acquired by The Sage Group PLC for $850 million in 2017.

History
Intacct was founded by Odysseas Tsatalos and David Chandler Thomas in 1999 as one of the first accounting applications for the cloud. The company was headquartered in San Jose, California, grew organically and offered a suite of accounting software that could serve medium and large-sized businesses with consolidated ERP, and e-commerce features.

In 2000, Intacct got its first institutional investor, venture capital firm HWVP and completed a Series A round of $10 million. From 2001 to 2014, the company raised $130 million in funding primarily led by the Battery Ventures, BVP, Sigma Partners and Emergence Capital with the last round of $30 million in 2014 with the company valuation of $211 million.

In 2017, Intacct Corporation was acquired by the British multinational accounting software company, The Sage Group PLC, for $850 million and was subsequently rebranded as Sage Intacct.

Features
Sage Intacct has a suite of subscription-based accounting products. Its web-based applications are built on top of its internally developed platform. Sage Intacct’s application includes accounts payable, accounts receivable, cash management, collaborate, general ledger, order management, purchasing, and reporting and dashboads.

In addition to the core financial product, Sage Intacct released add-on software applications for contract and subscription billing, contract revenue management, fixed assets, inventory management , multi-entity and global  consolidations, project accounting, project billing, sales and use tax,  time and expense management and vendor payment services. It allows integration of third-party software such as Salesforce, Certify, ADP, SAP Concur and others.

Operations
Founded and headquartered in San Jose, the company initially grew organically, but more recently has grown primarily through acquisitions. In addition to its US offices, it also operates in India and Romania, as well as product localizations being developed at Sage's other international offices such as Barcelona, Spain, Newcastle upon Tyne, UK and Poland. Sage Intacct has more than 14,000 customers and nearly 500 employees across the world.

Awards and recognition
2016 BIG Innovation Awards recognized by the Business Intelligence Group.
Won two 2016 Best in Biz Award
Best Business Products of 2016 by PC Magazine 
Best Places to Work in the Bay Area for 2010 to 2017
2017 Best Software for Finance Teams list
2019 Top 50 Products for Mid-Market (#39) by G2

See also
 Comparison of accounting software

References

External links
 Official website

Accounting software
Financial software companies
Intacct
Software companies established in 1999
American companies established in 1999
Software companies based in the San Francisco Bay Area
Companies based in Silicon Valley
Software companies of the United States
1999 establishments in California